Holland & Barrett (H&B) is a multinational chain of health food shops with over 1,300 stores in 16 countries, including a substantial presence in the United Kingdom, Republic of Ireland, Netherlands, Belgium, Mainland China, Hong Kong, India, Saudi Arabia and UAE.

History
Holland & Barrett was formed in 1870 by Alfred Slapps Barrett and Major William Holland, who bought a grocery store in Bishop's Stortford, selling groceries and clothing.

They developed their business into two shops – a grocery store and a clothing store. It is also evident that in 1900 they occupied a store in the High Street of Epsom. In the 1920s, Alfred Button & Sons bought the business and kept the name Holland & Barrett.

Holland & Barrett has since changed hands a number of times. In 1970 Booker acquired Holland & Barrett, also acquiring Heath & Heather stores which they later renamed Holland & Barrett. Lloyds Pharmacy purchased Holland & Barrett in 1992, after which NBTY acquired Holland & Barrett in 1997. NBTY was bought by American private equity firm The Carlyle Group in 2010.

The brand has become synonymous with the sale of vitamins, supplements and homeopathy, to the point that pro-homeopathy former MP David Tredinnick has been dubbed "The Hon. Member for Holland and Barrett".

On 21 June 2017, it was announced that a series of negotiations had commenced by NBTY on behalf of The Carlyle Group to sell off Holland & Barrett in its entirety. A few companies showed interest in acquiring the company, namely A.S. Watson the owner of Superdrug and The Perfume Shop, and KKR the private equity firm both showed an interest in early negotiations. It was a sale that could potentially be worth $6bn.

On 26 June 2017, it was reported that Holland & Barrett was sold for £1.8 billion to L1 Retail, a group formerly controlled by Russian billionaire oligarch Mikhail Fridman. Fridman stepped down from L1 Retail's parent company in early March 2022, after the European Union imposed sanctions on them in the wake of the Russian invasion of Ukraine.

Advertising
Singer Kim Wilde featured in Holland & Barrett TV advertising between 2004–05, while they've also been voiced by former Blue Peter presenter Gethin Jones and actor David Jason.

A number of Holland & Barrett's advertisements and point of sale displays have been adjudicated as misleading, making unfair comparisons or claims that are unsupported by robust evidence.

Franchising

In the 2000s the company started to expand internationally using franchising. The first three franchise stores opened in October 2008 in Durban, South Africa and the company subsequently had nine franchise stores operating in South Africa, all by the same franchisee. In Singapore, the company set up sixteen franchise stores and one store was added in Malta in 2009. A global expansion plan was set up for the Holland & Barrett brand with bigger country franchise partners, and several country additions to the franchise business were expected in 2010.

"Workfare" controversy
From February 2012, Holland & Barrett in the UK were subject to adverse publicity, boycotts and demonstrations at stores, due to their use of workfare participants. The company published no corporate response or interaction via social media for several months until, on 5 July 2012, Holland & Barrett announced it was pulling out of the scheme, citing the negative publicity. The Guardian reported that the company was "no longer prepared to face further bad press and in-store protests", attributing the change of mind to pressure from Solidarity Federation and Boycott Workfare. Holland & Barrett will "now pay all its workforce" and will "henceforth only take apprentices paid at the national rate of £2.60 an hour".

References

External links
 

British companies established in 1870
Retail companies established in 1870
1870 establishments in England
Health food stores
Companies based in Warwickshire
Food retailers of the United Kingdom
1997 mergers and acquisitions
Nuneaton